Xavier Mous (born 4 August 1995) is a Dutch professional footballer who plays as a goalkeeper for Heerenveen in the Eredivisie.

Club career 
Mous is a youth exponent from AFC Ajax. He made his professional debut at Jong Ajax on 16 January 2015 in an Eerste Divisie game against SC Telstar in a 1–1 draw. He played the full game. In the Summer of 2015, Mous was loaned to FC Oss for the 2015–16 Eerste Divisie season.  After his expiring contract with Ajax had not been extended, Mous signed a two-year deal after his loan spell.

On 24 June 2019, it was confirmed, that Mous had joined PEC Zwolle on a two-year contract with an option for another year.

On 25 June 2021, he moved to Heerenveen on a two-year contract.

References

External links
 

1995 births
Living people
Association football goalkeepers
Dutch footballers
AFC Ajax players
Jong Ajax players
TOP Oss players
SC Cambuur players
PEC Zwolle players
SC Heerenveen players
Eredivisie players
Eerste Divisie players
Footballers from Haarlem